Todd Brian May (born April 2, 1965, born in Lakewood, California and raised in Brea, California) is an American guitarist and composer. He was a founding member of the Orange County thrash metal band Attaxe from 1985 until 1992. Prior to forming Attaxe he was a member of the L.A. metal band Knightmare II in 1984-1985.

After leaving Attaxe in the summer of 1992, he composed a 4 movement symphonic work in 1995 titled "Orchestral Suite #1: Alaska".  A second symphonic work was completed in 1996 titled "Orchestral Suite #2: Norway".

In the early summer of 1996 he joined with members of the O.C. band "Unit J" to form the band "Code" in which he performed as vocalist and guitarist as well as writing many of the band's songs including "Laughing Underwater", "Drown With Me", "Magnify", "Everything", "Misnomer", "Follow the Blind", "Rusted Shell" and "Jesus Christ Phase".  After releasing a 5-song CD in 2000, and spending the next few years self recording material for a full-length CD that never came to fruition, he left "Code" in November 2003 to focus on fatherhood and went on a musical hiatus.

In 2006 he composed a fifth movement to the "Orchestral Suite #1: Alaska", as well as continuing to compose symphonic pieces.

In 2009 Attaxe members Bonaventura, Cason, Houle and May re-grouped and began writing new material for a possible new project.

May is currently working on a new project blending many genres, including symphonic instruments, under the name The Wide Arrays, with a tentative release planned for 2011, as well as occasionally performing locally around the L.A. area with "The Marksmen" playing covers of 1960s, 1970s and 1980s rock/blues gems.

References

1965 births
Living people
American heavy metal guitarists
20th-century American guitarists